Kulathur  is a village in the Gandharvakottai block of Pudukkottai district, Tamil Nadu, India.

Demographics 
 census, Kulathur had a total population of 3,275 with 1,620 males and 1,655 females in 719 households, with 360 children of age 0–6. 1,216 men and 896 women were literate.

References

Villages in Pudukkottai district